Kehler FV is a German association football club from the town of Kehl, Baden-Württemberg. In addition to fielding a football side, the club has departments for athletics, and badminton, as well as general fitness and recreational sport.



History
The team was established in 1907, and from 1958–1966 and 1970–1974 played in the third tier Amateurliga Südbaden. Following several seasons as an "elevator club" moving frequently up and down between the Landesliga Südbaden (VI) and the Verbandsliga Südbaden (V), FV has advanced to the Oberliga Baden-Württemberg (V) following a second place Verbandsliga finish and successful promotion playoff in 2008.

The club played the next eight seasons in the Oberliga with an eighth place in 2012–13 as its best result but was relegated in 2015–16.

Honours
The club's honours:

League
Verbandsliga Südbaden
 Runners-up: 2008
Landesliga Südbaden
 Champions: 2006

Cup
 South Baden Cup
 Winners: 1957

Other
The club includes a successful bobsleigh department. Club member Bodo Bittner was part of the bronze medal-winning four-man team at the 1976 Winter Olympics. Peer Joechel won a gold medal at the 1993 World championships in the two-man competition.

Sprinter Georg Nückles was the European 400m indoor champion in 1972 and German indoor 400m champion in 1972 and 1973.

Recent managers
Recent managers of the club:

Recent seasons
The recent season-by-season performance of the club:

 With the introduction of the Regionalligas in 1994 and the 3. Liga in 2008 as the new third tier, below the 2. Bundesliga, all leagues below dropped one tier.

References

Sources
 Grüne, Hardy (2001). Vereinslexikon. Kassel: AGON Sportverlag

External links
Official team site
Das deutsche Fußball-Archiv historical German domestic league tables 
Kehler FV at Weltfussball.de

Football clubs in Germany
Football clubs in Baden-Württemberg
Association football clubs established in 1907
1907 establishments in Germany